The 2021–22 Anaheim Ducks season was the 29th season for the National Hockey League franchise that was established on June 15, 1993.

On November 9, 2021, former general manager Bob Murray was placed on administrative leave by the Ducks pending the results of an ongoing investigation. The investigation is reportedly focused on Murray's alleged history of verbal abuse to players and staff members. Assistant general manager Jeff Solomon was initially named as acting general manager but was then named interim general manager when Murray resigned on November 10. Pat Verbeek was named general manager on February 3, 2022. The Ducks were eliminated from playoff contention on April 10, 2022, after a 5–2 loss to the Carolina Hurricanes.

Standings

Divisional standings

Conference standings

Schedule and results

Preseason
The preseason schedule was published on July 29, 2021.

Regular season
The regular season schedule was released on July 22, 2021, with a break in February because of the NHL's participation in the 2022 Winter Olympics.

Player statistics

Skaters

Goaltenders

†Denotes player spent time with another team before joining the Ducks. Stats reflect time with the Ducks only.
‡Denotes player was traded mid-season. Stats reflect time with the Ducks only.
Bold/italics denotes franchise record.

Awards and honours

Awards

Milestones

Records

Transactions
The Ducks have been involved in the following transactions during the 2021–22 season.

Trades

Players acquired

Players lost

Signings

Draft picks

Below are the Anaheim Ducks selections at the 2021 NHL Entry Draft, which will be held on July 23 and 24, 2021, virtually via video conference call from the NHL Network studios in Secaucus, New Jersey, due to the COVID-19 pandemic.

References 

2021–22 NHL season by team
Anaheim Ducks seasons
Anaheim Ducks
Anaheim Ducks